Clyde Thomas Bowers (July 29, 1881 – September 30, 1968) was an American Democratic politician who served as a member of the Virginia Senate, representing the state's 15th district.

References

External links
 
 

1881 births
1968 deaths
Democratic Party Virginia state senators
20th-century American politicians